Football strategy can refer to the strategy of any of the sports referred to as football.

See:
Association football tactics and skills
American football strategy
Computer Football Strategy, a Commodore 64 computer game by Avalon Hill